Alan Mouchawar (born August 3, 1960) is a former water polo player who won a silver medal for the United States at the 1988 Summer Olympics in Seoul, South Korea. He attended undergraduate of Stanford University where he won 3 national championships And was a 4 time all American.   He then went to  medical school at UCSD And graduated in 1987. After medical school he participated in the 1988 summer Olympics.  After the Olympics he did an anesthesia residency at UCSF and an ICU fellowship at Stanford. In 2002, he was inducted into the USA Water Polo Hall of Fame. He currently works as a cardiac anesthesiologist at Hoag Hospital in Newport Beach.

See also
 List of Olympic medalists in water polo (men)

References

External links
 

1960 births
Living people
American male water polo players
Olympic silver medalists for the United States in water polo
Water polo players at the 1988 Summer Olympics
Stanford Cardinal men's water polo players
Sportspeople from Los Angeles
Place of birth missing (living people)
Medalists at the 1988 Summer Olympics
Long Beach Polytechnic High School alumni